Fatma Ahmed Kamal Shaker (8 February 193128 November 2017), better known by her stage name Shadia (Shādiyya), was an Egyptian actress and singer. She was famous for her roles in light comedies and drama in the 1950s and 1960s. She was the third wife of Salah Zulfikar. Shadia was one of the iconic actresses and singers in Egypt and the Middle East region and a symbol of the golden age of Egyptian cinema and is known of her many patriotic songs. Her movies and songs are popular in Egypt and all the Arab World. Critics consider her the most successful comprehensive Egyptian and Arabic artist of all time. Her first appearance in a film was in "Azhar wa Ashwak" (Flowers and Thorns), and her last film was "La Tas'alni Man Ana" (Don't Ask Me Who I Am).

She is also known for her patriotic song "Ya Habibti Ya Masr" (Oh Egypt, My Love) and her breakthrough leading role came in the 1959 Egyptian film "Al Maraa Al Maghoula" (The Unknown Woman) directed by Mahmoud Zulfikar. Six of her movies are listed in the top 100 Egyptian movies of the 20th century.

In April 2015, Shadia became the first actress to be awarded an honorary doctorate by the Egyptian Academy of Arts. She was given the nickname "Idol of the Masses" following her successful movie "Maaboudat El Gamaheer" (Idol of the Masses). Other notable nicknames include "The Guitar of the Arabic Singing"  and "The Golden Guitar" .

Early life
Born as "Fatma Ahmed Kamal Shaker" in 1931, in Al-Helmyia El Gadida, in Cairo,  Egypt. Shadia was born to an Egyptian father Ahmed Kamal Sahker, from Sharqia and a Egyptian mother. In 1947, she fell in love with an Egyptian officer from Upper Egypt, and she got heartbroken after his death during the 1948 war.
She had five sisters and brothers. She was the youngest of her sisters and the second youngest among all her siblings. Since her childhood, Shadia loved to sing and was encouraged to pursue music at primary school. Moreover, she began acting at the age of fifteen. Shadia was the voice of Egypt during hard and war times, she was famous of her Egyptian patriotic songs, especially "Ya Habibti Ya Masr" (Oh Egypt, My Love) and "Aqwa Mn El Zaman" (Stronger Than Time). She participated in many operettas along with other notable Egyptian and Arabic singers about Egypt and the Arab world, including: "Al Watan Al Akbar" (The Great Nation), "El Geel El Sa'ed" (The Rising Generation), and "Soot El Gamaheer" (The Voice of the Masses).

Career
Shaker was given the stage name "Shadia" by herself following the name of a newborn of one of her family's friends. In her heyday during the 1950s and 1960s, Shadia acted in numerous melodramas, romance, and comedy films. However, it was her musical talent as a singer that established Shadia as one of the most important Egyptian cinema stars of her era. Overall, as "Shadia", she performed in more than 100 films.

Shadia is credited for acting alongside leading man Salah Zulfikar in his film debut, "Oyoun Sahrana" (Wakeful Eyes, 1956). Later, she paired with Zulfikar in 6 films forming a famous duet and achieving major commercial and critical success, this duet turned out to be an Egyptian cinema classic. She also starred in more than 30 films with the actor Kamal El Shennawy, and sang opposite Farid El Atrash and Abdel Halim Hafez, such as in "Ma'boudat El Gamaheer" (The People's Idol, 1967). She also appeared with Faten Hamama in Ezz El-Dine Zulfikar’s "Mawe'd Ma'a El Hayah" (Appointment with Life, 1954), and in "El Mar'a El Maghola" (The Unknown Woman, 1959) of Mahmoud Zulfikar, she played the role of Fatma in a heavy melodrama.

Other notable films she starred in include "El les we El Kelab" (The Thief and the Dogs, 1962) and in her comedy roles in films "El Zouga raqam 13" (Wife Number 13, 1962), and her famous trilogy alongside Egypt's iconic actor and film producer Salah Zulfikar; "Miraty Modeer A'am" (My Wife, the Director General, 1966), "Karamat Zawgaty" (My Wife's Dignity, 1967) and "Afreet Mirati" (My Wife's Goblin, 1968), was a huge success.

Indeed, Shadia was often cast in cunning and cheeky roles, however, she also played serious roles, such as in Salah Zulfikar Films production; "Shey Min El Khouf" (A Taste of Fear, 1969) and "Uyoon Sahranah" (Wakeful Eyes, 1956) of Ezz El-Dine Zulfikar and "El Tareeq" (The Road, 1964), and "Lamset Hanan" (A Toutch of Tenderness, 1971), her last film opposite Salah Zulfikar, and in the stage version of "Raya and Sakina", which was based on the true story of two Alexandrian serial killers and directed by Hussein Kamal (1953).

Shadia also produced two films, and also appeared in several films in Japan.Upon returning from the premiere of "Raya and Sakina", Shadia stated that she gave serious thought that night to the idea of repentance. The following morning, she informed her producers that she wanted no part in the play from then on, but eventually promised to finish her work when they insisted that she do so. Thereafter, Shadia retired from the film and music industry, and went on a Umrah to Mecca, where she met the popular Egyptian Azhari scholar Sheikh El Shaarawy. Her meeting with El-Shaarawy influenced Shadia to reach her final decision to start wearing the hijab. 

Her mega hit song "Ya Habibti Ya Masr" (Oh Egypt, My love), was considered as one of the best patriotic songs ever. During a TV-interview, Shadia said regarding her famous patriotic song: "When I am singing to my homeland, it is even way more romantic and more honest than any romantic song. Here I am singing to my home, my land. There was a period when Egypt's name was erased (Nasser's era), Egypt’s name will never get erased from our hearts". After almost 25 years of her retirement, Shadia's song became an anthem of the Egyptian Revolution of 2011.

Retirement
Shadia retired at the age of 50. She came out and cited the reason for her retirement being religion, she explained that she had been through many hard periods and rough circumstances throughout her life that had veered her away from her career and made her return to god once more. She decided to dedicate the rest of her life to care for orphan children stating that it's her life's greatest joy. She also donated all the money that she made during her acting and singing career to charities and stated that this was a decision that she never once hesitated to do.

Illness and death
Shadia was hospitalized on 4 November 2017 after suffering a massive stroke in Cairo. She was placed under intensive care. Her nephew, Khaled Shaker, said during a televised phone conversation that she recovered from the stroke and could identify her relatives and the people around her. He added, however, that her illness was complicated by pneumonia, despite her recovery. Shadia's condition stabilized on 9 November, and President Abdel Fattah el-Sisi visited her that day at Al-Galaa Hospital. Shaker later said that the first words she spoke after recovering were "I want to go home", but had speech difficulties in general.

On 28 November, Shadia died from respiratory failure caused by the pneumonia.

Tribute
On February 8, 2021, Google celebrated her 90th birthday with a Google Doodle. The Doodle was displayed in Egypt, Israel and Sweden.

Filmography

Source:

References

External links

 
 Lost Continent: Cinema of Egypt

1931 births
2017 deaths
Egyptian film actresses
Egyptian television actresses
20th-century Egyptian women singers
Egyptian nationalists
People from Sharqia Governorate
Singers who perform in Egyptian Arabic
Egyptian people of Turkish descent
Singers from Cairo
Deaths from respiratory failure
Deaths from pneumonia in Egypt